KBSK (89.9 FM) is a radio station licensed to McCall, Idaho. The station is owned by Boise State University, and is affiliated with Boise State Public Radio. KBSK airs a jazz format.

The station's programming also airs on the HD Radio subchannels of KBSU-FM in Boise, KBSS in Sun Valley and KBSW in Twin Falls.

See also
 List of jazz radio stations in the United States

External links
Official Website

BSK
NPR member stations
Boise State University